George Franklin Gilder (born November 29, 1939) is an American investor, author, economist, and co-founder of the Discovery Institute. His 1981 book, Wealth and Poverty, advanced a case for supply-side economics and capitalism during the early months of the Reagan administration. He is the chairman of George Gilder Fund Management, LLC.

Early years and personal life
Gilder was born in New York City and raised in New York and Massachusetts. He is a great-grandson of designer Louis Comfort Tiffany. His father, Richard Watson Gilder, was killed flying in the United States Army Air Forces in World War II when Gilder was two years old.

He spent most of his childhood with his mother, Anne Spring (Alsop), and his stepfather, Gilder Palmer, on a dairy farm in Tyringham, Massachusetts. Palmer, a college roommate of his father, was deeply involved with his upbringing, as was the family of David Rockefeller, his godfather.

Education
Gilder attended Hamilton School in New York City, Phillips Exeter Academy, and Harvard University, graduating in 1962. He later returned to Harvard as a fellow at the Harvard Institute of Politics, and edited the Ripon Forum, the newspaper of the liberal Republican Ripon Society.

Marine Corps
Gilder served in the United States Marine Corps.

Career

Speechwriting
In the 1960s Gilder served as a speechwriter for several prominent officials and candidates, including Nelson Rockefeller, George W. Romney, and Richard Nixon. He worked as a spokesman for the liberal Republican Senator Charles Mathias, as antiwar protesters surrounded the capital; some eventually scared Gilder out of his apartment. Gilder moved to Harvard Square the following year, and he became a writer who modeled himself after Joan Didion.

With his college roommate, Bruce Chapman, he wrote an attack on the anti-intellectual policies of the 1964 Republican presidential candidate Barry Goldwater, The Party That Lost Its Head (1966). He later recanted this attack: "The far Right — the same men I dismissed as extremists in my youth — turned out to know far more than I did. At least the 'right-wing extremists', as I confidently called them, were right on almost every major policy issue from welfare to Vietnam to Keynesian economics and defense — while I, in my Neo-Conservative sophistication, was nearly always wrong."

Supply-side economics
Supply-side economics was formulated in the mid-1970s by Jude Wanniski and Robert L. Bartley at The Wall Street Journal as a counterweight to the reigning "demand-side" Keynesian economics. At the center of the concept was the Laffer curve, the idea that high tax rates reduce government revenue.

Gilder wrote a book extending the ideas of his Visible Man (1978) into the realm of economics, to balance his theory of poverty with a theory of wealth. The book, published as the best-selling Wealth and Poverty in 1981, communicated the ideas of supply-side economics to a wide audience in the United States and the world.

Gilder also contributed to the development of supply-side economics when he served as Chairman of the Lehrman Institute's Economic Roundtable, as Program Director for the Manhattan Institute, and as a frequent contributor to Laffer's economic reports and the editorial page of The Wall Street Journal.

Technology
In the 1990s, he became an evangelist of technology and the Internet. He discussed emerging trends in several books and his newsletter, the Gilder Technology Report.

The first mention of the word "Digerati" on USENET occurred in 1992 and referred to an article by Gilder in Upside magazine. His other books include Life After Television, a 1990 book that predicted microchip "telecomputers" connected by fiberoptic cable would make broadcast-model television obsolete. The book was also notable for being published by the Federal Express company and featuring full-page advertisements for that company on every fifth page.

Gilder wrote the books Microcosm, about Carver Mead and the CMOS microchip revolution; Telecosm, about the promise of fiber optics; and his latest, The Silicon Eye, about the Foveon X3 sensor, a digital camera imager chip. The book cover of the Silicon Eye reads, "How a Silicon Valley Company Aims to Make All Current Computers, Cameras, and Cell Phones Obsolete." The Foveon sensor has not achieved this goal and has not yet been used in cell phones.

Gilder is an investor in private companies and serves as the chairman of the advisory board in Israel-based ASOCS that he discovered during his research for Israel Test.

On women and feminism
In the early 1970s, Gilder wrote an article in the Ripon Forum defending President Richard Nixon's veto of a day-care bill sponsored by Senator Walter Mondale (D-Minnesota) and Senator Jacob Javits (R-New York). He was fired as editor as a result. To defend himself, he appeared on Firing Line.

Gilder moved to New Orleans and worked in the mornings for Ben Toledano, Republican candidate for the United States Senate in 1972 and the party's nominee for mayor of New Orleans in 1970. He also wrote Sexual Suicide (1973), which was revised and reissued as Men and Marriage (1986). The book achieved a succès de scandale and Time made Gilder "Male Chauvinist Pig of the Year."

Support for immigration
Gilder has praised mass immigration as an economic boon in both the US and Israel. Although Gilder's support for mass immigration is framed by high tech hubs such as Silicon Valley's need for computer programmers, he sees recent American immigration policy as being vital to American prosperity overall.

The American Spectator
Gilder bought the conservative political monthly magazine The American Spectator from its founder, Emmett Tyrrell, in the summer of 2000, switching the magazine's focus from politics to technology.

Experiencing his own financial problems in 2002,
Gilder sold the Spectator back to Tyrrell.

Speaking engagements and editorial contributions
Gilder lectures internationally on economics, technology, education, and social theory. He has addressed audiences from Washington, DC, to the Vatican, and he has appeared at conferences, public policy events, and media outlets.

Wealth and Poverty
After completing Visible Man in the late 1970s, Gilder began writing "The Pursuit of Poverty." In early 1981, Basic Books published the result as Wealth and Poverty. It was an analysis of the roots of economic growth. Reviewing it within a month of the inauguration of the Reagan Administration, The New York Times reviewer called it "A Guide to Capitalism". It offered, he wrote, "a creed for capitalism worthy of intelligent people." The book was a New York Times bestseller, and eventually sold over a million copies.

In Wealth and Poverty, Gilder extended the sociological and anthropological analysis of his early books in which he had advocated for the socialization of men into service to women through work and marriage. He wove these sociological themes into the economic policy prescriptions of supply-side economics. In his eyes the breakup of the nuclear family and the policies of demand-side economics led to poverty, while family and supply-side policies led to wealth.

In reviewing the problems of the immediate past—the inflation, recession, and urban problems of the 1970s—and proposing his supply-side solutions, Gilder argued not just the practical but the moral superiority of supply-side capitalism over the alternatives. "Capitalism begins with giving," he asserted, while New Deal liberalism created moral hazard. It was work, family, and faith that created wealth out of poverty. "It is this supply-side moral vision that underlies all the economic arguments of Wealth and Poverty," he wrote.

In 1994, Gilder wrote that the poor in America are "ruined by the overflow of American prosperity" and "moral decay" and that they are in need of "Christian teaching from the churches."

Intelligent design
He helped found the Discovery Institute with Bruce Chapman. The organization started as a moderate group that aimed to privatize and modernize Seattle's transit systems. It later became the leading thinktank of the intelligent design movement, with Gilder writing many articles for intelligent design and against the theory of evolution.

Publications

Books
 The Party That Lost Its Head Alfred A. Knopf; 1st edition (1966). With Bruce Chapman.
 Sexual Suicide (1973)
 Naked Nomads: Unmarried Men in America (1974)
 Visible Man: A True Story of Post-Racist America (1978)
 Wealth and Poverty (1981)
 Men and Marriage (1986)
 The Spirit of Enterprise (1986)
 Microcosm: The Quantum Revolution In Economics And Technology (1989)
 Life After Television (1990)
 Recapturing the Spirit of Enterprise (1992)
 The Meaning of the Microcosm (1997)
 Telecosm: The World After Bandwidth Abundance (2000)
 The Silicon Eye: How a Silicon Valley Company Aims to Make All Current Computers, Cameras, and Cell Phones Obsolete (2005)
 The Silicon Eye: Microchip Swashbucklers and the Future of High-Tech Innovation (2006)
 The Israel Test (2009)
 Wealth and Poverty: A New Edition for the 21st Century (2012)
 Knowledge and Power: The Information Theory of Capitalism and How it is Revolutionizing our World (2013)
 The Scandal of Money (2016)
 Life after Google: The Fall of Big Data and the Rise of the Blockchain Economy (2018)
 Gaming AI: Why AI Can't Think but Can Transform Jobs (2020)

Contributions by Gilder

Notes

External links

 George Gilder's Gilder Technology Report
 Gilder Publishing, LLC

Interviews
 Booknotes interview with Gilder on Microcosm: The Quantum Revolution in Economics and Technology, September 24, 1989.
 Audio interview with Larry Magid at IT Conversations

1939 births
Living people
American political writers
American economics writers
American speechwriters
American technology writers
Discovery Institute fellows and advisors
Futurologists
Harvard University alumni
Military personnel from New York City
Writers from New York City
Phillips Exeter Academy alumni
The American Spectator people
United States Marines
Wired (magazine) people
20th-century American non-fiction writers
21st-century American non-fiction writers
New York (state) Republicans
Massachusetts Republicans
Male critics of feminism
People from Tyringham, Massachusetts
20th-century American male writers
American male non-fiction writers
21st-century American male writers